Ouija is a 2007 Philippine horror-thriller film from director Topel Lee, his paranormal first feature-length, from the screenplay by Aloy Adlawan. The film stars Jolina Magdangal, Iza Calzado, Rhian Ramos, Ruby Rodriguez and Judy Ann Santos with Desiree del Valle is haunted by a spirit they accidentally unleashed while playing an Ouija board. The film was produced by VIVA and GMA Pictures.

This is the second film co-produced by GMA Films and VIVA Films years after VIVA withdrew from GMA. The joint production between the two companies was proven a success since fans believe that there is still chemistry among the two companies and it led to more jointly produced movies that became box-office hits.

Plot
Half-sisters Aileen (Judy Ann Santos) and Romina (Jolina Magdangal-Escueta), along with first cousins Sandra (Iza Calzado) and Ruth (Rhian Ramos), reunite in Camiguin to bury their grandmother. Accompanied by Sandra's friend, Lucy (Desiree del Valle), the five girls dare to call on the spirits of the dead when they find their old Ouija board from when they were kids. The Ouija board is burned by accident before they are able to finish the ritual, trapping a murderous entity around them. As they begin to realize the terror that they have brought upon themselves, Aileen and Romina's hostile relationship becomes even more strained, while Lucy's sanity brings a heavy burden on Sandra, and Ruth's Yaya (Ruby Rodriguez) and boyfriend, Gino (JC de Vera), is unknowingly pulled into the danger and horror that awaits all of them. Aileen, a criminal advocate, accidentally kills a rape victim who was also haunted.

Confronted by imminent death, the girls have nowhere to go unless they can identify the spirit and find out where it is buried. It is only by leading the spirit to its burial ground that they will be able to release the spirit from the Ouija board and survive its fatal hauntings.

Using the Ouija board, the girls find that the ghost of a girl named Magda the Snake (she is called “The Snake” because she had the skin of snake at birth) is haunting them. They find the dead body of Magda from under the sea and made the spirit free with the help of a Christian priest. Magda was murdered by her envious twin sister Melda, because their parents loved Magda more. At the end it is revealed that it was Melda's spirit who haunted the girls and Magda's spirit was trying to protect them. Since they freed Magda's spirit, there is no one to protect them from Melda. At the end of the movie, Melda has killed every girl.

Cast

Main
Jolina Magdangal as Romina
Iza Calzado as Sandra
Rhian Ramos as Ruth
Judy Ann Santos as Aileen

Supporting
Desiree del Valle as Lucy
Ruby Rodriguez as Yaya
JC de Vera as Gino
Valerie Concepcion as Raped Victim
Perla Bautista as Lagring
Anita Linda as Lola Corazon

Jackie Lou Blanco as Raquel
Angelo Ilagan as Nilo
Nanding Josef as Ka Mario
JC Cuadrano as Doctor
Illonah Villanueva as Magda
Jean Villanueva as Melba

Special guests
Pinky Amador as Ralvenia
Chris Rawson as Dante
Shamaine Centenera-Buencamino as Elvyra
Eva Darren as Avantra
Dianne Hernandez as Cielo
Ehra Madrigal as Helena
Vangie Labalan as Francisco
Pauleen Luna as Carbonel
Ashley Cabrera as Erron
Jim Pebangco as Jacinta
Ryan Agoncillo as Flight Attendant

Reception
The movie is graded A by the Cinema Evaluation Board (CEB) of the Philippines. An A rating gives the film a 100% tax rebate on its earnings.

Awards and nominations
26th FAP (LUNA) Awards (2008)
Best Editing - Marya Ignacio
Best Musical Score - Carmina Robles (won)
Best Sound - Ditoy Aguila (won)

10th PASADO Awards (2008)
Best Actress - Judy Ann Santos (won)
Best Original Screenplay - Aloy Adlawan  (won)
Best Sound - Ditoy Aguila  (won)

24th PMPC Awards for Movies (2008)
Movie of the Year - GMA Films
Movie Director of the Year - Topel Lee
Movie Supporting Actress of the Year - Iza Calzado
New Movie Actress of the Year - Rhian Ramos
Movie Original Screenplay of the Year - Aloy Adlawan
Movie Cinematographer of the Year - Neil Daza
Movie Editor of the Year - Marya Ignacio
Movie Production Designer of the Year - Mark Sabas
Movie Musical Scorer of the Year - Carmina Robles Cuya 
Movie Sound Engineer of the Year - Ditoy Aguila and Rudy Gonzales (won)

5th Golden Screen Awards (2008)
Breakthrough Performance by an Actress - Rhian Ramos (won)
Best Visual Effects - Ignite Media

International screenings
The movie would have been the first GMA Films movie to have international screenings and the second Viva movie to have international screenings. The scheduled overseas premieres in four U.S. cities (Las Vegas, San Francisco, Los Angeles, and San Diego) were cancelled. Only the one in New Jersey pushed through. The movie is titled Seance internationally.

Home video release
GMA Records Home Video (distributed under license by Viva Video, Inc.) released Ouija now available on DVD and VCD format on September 12, 2007.

See also
 List of ghost films

References

External links 
 

GMA Pictures films
Viva Films films
2007 films
2000s Tagalog-language films
Philippine horror films
2000s English-language films
Films directed by Topel Lee